The 1950 BYU Cougars football team was an American football team that represented Brigham Young University (BYU) as a member of the Skyline Conference during the 1950 college football season. In their second season under head coach Chick Atkinson, the Cougars compiled an overall record of 4–5–1 with a mark of 1–3–1 against conference opponents, finished fifth in the Skyline, and were outscored by a total of 292 to 169.

Schedule

References

BYU
BYU Cougars football seasons
BYU Cougars football